Zeitlin is a matronymic Jewish surname. It is derived from the female name Zeitl according to the rules of Slavic languages, with the possessive suffix '-in' and literally means "Zeitl's".

When transliterated from Yiddish to Russian to English, the surname may be spelled as follows. Male forms: Tseytlin, Tseitlin, Tsetlin, Tzeitlin. Female forms (usually only for Slavic nationals): Tseytlina, Tseitlina, Tsetlina, Tzeitlina.

When transliterated via Polish, the surname may be spelled as Cejtlin,  Cajtlin, Zejtlin, Zajtlin.

The surname may refer to:
 Aaron Zeitlin (1889/1896/1898–1973), Russian-US Yiddish writer, composer, and poet
 Alexander Zeitlin (1900–1998), Russian-American military leader
 Alexandre Zeitlin (1872–1946), sculptor
 Benh Zeitlin (born 1982), US filmmaker
 Denny Zeitlin (born 1938), US jazz pianist
 Froma Zeitlin (born 1933), US classics scholar
 Harriet Zeitlin (born 1929), American artist
 Hillel Zeitlin (1871–1942), Polish Yiddish writer
 Jacob Zeitlin (1902–1987), American bookseller and poet
 Joshua Zeitlin (1742–1822), Shklov-born Russian-Jewish rabbinical scholar and philanthropist
 Joshua ben Aaron Zeitlin (1823–1888), Kiev-born Russian-Jewish scholar and philanthropist
 Judith T. Zeitlin, American-Jewish scholar of Chinese literature, chair of the Department of East Asian Languages & Civilizations at the University of Chicago
 Lev Tseitlin (1881-1952), a violinist and teacher
 Leo Zeitlin (1884–1930), a violinist, violist, conductor and impresario 
 Mark Tseitlin (1943–2022), a Russian-Israeli chess grandmaster
 Michael Lvovitch Tsetlin (1924–1966), Russian mathematician and physicist
 Mikhail Tseitlin (born 1947), Belarusian chess grandmaster
 Mirah Yom Tov Zeitlyn (born 1974), American musician
 Michail Yulyevich Tseytlin (Михаил Ю́льевич Цейтлин), also as  M. Yu. Ceitlin and M. Ju. Zeitlin, a Russian mathematician, who worked on the book Gradshteyn and Ryzhik in the 1960s and early 1970s
 Solomon Zeitlin (1892–1976), Lithuanian-Jewish rabbi, historian
 William Zeitlin (1850–1921), Russian-Jewish scholar and bibliographer
 Zvi Zeitlin (1922–2012), Russian-US violinist
 Vladislav Tseytlin (born 1971) is a Uzbekistani football FIFA referee

Jewish surnames
Polish-language surnames
Russian-language surnames
Matronymic surnames